Saint Alkmund's Church was a Victorian church, which stood in a Georgian square between Bridgegate and Queen Street in Derby; this was the only Georgian square in the city. The church and its yard were demolished in 1968 for construction of a road to improve traffic flow.

Churches dedicated to  Saint Alkmund had been constructed on this site since the 9th century.

The building was replaced with a modern church on Kedleston Road, St Alkmund’s (new) Church, Derby.

History
The church was built in 1846 by the architect Henry Isaac Stevens at a cost of £7,700 on the site of several earlier churches stretching back to the 9th century all named after Saint Alkmund. It was constructed in ashlar stone in a Gothic style. Inside the church was an architectural triumph, with high pillars and stone arches.  The aisle and nave were wide and the church featured a chancel. The steeple was supported by flying buttresses.

The foundation stone was laid on 6 May 1844 and the completed church was opened on 15 September 1846 by the Bishop of Lichfield.

Construction of the church caused controversy among the Catholic citizens of Derby.  The  spire was built directly in the line of sight of the Catholic St Mary's Church and, for many years, the Anglican church was referred to as "The Church of the Holy Spite". Derby painter Joseph Wright was re-buried in St Alkmund's churchyard upon completion of the building in 1846.

The church was surrounded by many two- and three-storey townhouses that lined the square and churchyard. Other buildings of interest included The Lamb Inn, opened in 1835, which featured its own brewery; a gabled sweet shop dating from the 17th century sited on the corner of the square and Bridgegate; and several shops dating to medieval times, located at the Queen Street entrance to the yard.  The area was described by Sir Nikolaus Pevsner as 'A revival of 18th century unmatched, a quiet oasis.'

During the mid-1950s it was discovered that the load-bearing wood in the steeple was warping and rotting.  This led to the steeple being 'capped' and the top 20 feet were removed for restoration work to be done. This was done due to structural weaknesses being found in the stonework and woodwork in the steeple itself. Plans were laid down to replace the top of the steeple, but was never completed.  Along with the top of the spire, several of the Gothic detailing pieces on the roof were also removed, but no reasons for this were ever given.

Organ
The previous church had an organ by Alexander Buckingham which was installed in 1825,  but this was too small for the new church, so was sold by the churchwardens. A new organ was erected by private subscription at a cost of £250 and built by Forster and Andrews. It was opened on 4 November 1858. This organ was found to be inadequate, and in July 1888 it was replaced by a new instrument costing £1,200 constructed by Thomas Chambers Lewis. On 22 March 1889 the famous French organist, Alexandre Guilmant gave a recital. The organ had some modifications by John H Adkins in 1908, 1910 and 1938. A specification of the organ can be found on the National Pipe Organ Register.

Organists
F. Fritche ca. 1843
Josiah Davenport Norton 1858 – 1865
William Lambe Dodd 1865 – 1887 (afterwards organist of St Peter's Church, Derby)
Ernest William Bayley 1887 – 1903
Norman Frederick Byng Johnson 1903 – 1907 (formerly organist of St John the Baptist Church, Beeston)
Bernard Fowles 1907 – 1911
F. Isherwood Plummer 1911 – 1920
A. W. Wilford 1920 – 1927
Leslie B. Taylor 1927 – 1933 (afterwards organist of Darley Abbey Parish)
Frank S. Gelsthorpe 1933 – 1936
Leslie B. Taylor 1936 – 1941 (afterwards organist of St Werburgh's Church, Derby)
Eric G. Barringer ca. 1948
George Moore 1959 - 1964

Demolition and New Building
In 1963, Derby County Borough Council announced plans to improve traffic flow in the borough of Derby.  Part of this scheme was to build a road that would carve through the site of the church and the churchyard, which met with strong criticism from many Derbeians.

However, the site was issued with a compulsory purchase order and demolition began in 1968. During the works, the site of the original church was uncovered, along with a stone sarcophagus believed to be St Alkmund's and several other artefacts. Today, the former church site is taken over by Derby's inner ring road, called St Alkmund's Way (A601), and little trace of the church is to be found. A plaque was erected to mark the history of the church and building.

A modernistic church of the same name was built on Kedleston Road in the early 1970s to replace the original building, see St Alkmund’s (new) Church, Derby.

References

Churches in Derby
Church of England church buildings in Derbyshire
Demolished buildings and structures in England
Churches completed in 1846